The North Dakota League of Cities was founded in Grand Forks, North Dakota, in 1912. It serves as a key resource for cities and park districts in North Dakota and also represents the interests of municipalities in state and federal public policy discussions. It is now located in Bismarck, North Dakota.

External links
North Dakota League of Cities website

Organizations based in North Dakota
Civic and political organizations of the United States